The First Presbyterian Church of Far Rockaway, formerly known as the Russell Sage Memorial Church, is a historic Presbyterian church in the Far Rockaway neighborhood of Queens in New York City.  It was commissioned by Olivia Slocum Sage as a memorial to her late husband, Russell Sage (1816–1906), as they used to summer in the area.  She also commissioned a large, memorial stained glass window of a landscape, designed by Tiffany Studio.

Designed by the architect Ralph Adams Cram (1863–1942), the church was built between 1908 and 1910 and is a Neo-Gothic-style building laid out in a traditional cruciform plan.  It is constructed of brick with concrete trim and a steeply sloping slate-covered roof.  Connected to the church are a parish hall and manse.  The surrounding landscape, designed by the Olmsted Brothers, is a contributing element to its designation of historic significance.

The church was listed on the National Register of Historic Places in 1986.

References

External links
Saving a Priceless Treasure

Presbyterian churches in New York City
Properties of religious function on the National Register of Historic Places in Queens, New York
Gothic Revival church buildings in New York City
Churches completed in 1910
1910 establishments in New York City